Covered Tracks is a 1938 German historical drama film directed by Veit Harlan and starring Kristina Söderbaum, Philip Dorn, and Charlotte Schultz. It was shot at the EFA Studios in Berlin's Halensee and the Bavaria Studios in Munich with location shooting taking place in both cities as well as in Paris. The film's sets were designed by the art directors Karl Haacker and Hermann Warm. It premiered at the Venice Film Festival.

Plot summary 
A young woman named Séraphine checks into a Parisian hotel with her ailing mother, having arrived to attend the 1867 International Exposition. When she comes back to the hotel with her mother's medication, she finds their room vacant and none of the staff remembers ever seeing her or her mother checking into the hotel. Séraphine then embarks on a quest to uncover the mystery of her mother's disappearance and prove her own sanity.

Cast

See also 
 Midnight Warning (1932)
 The Lady Vanishes (1938)
 So Long at the Fair (1950)
 Dangerous Crossing (1953)
 Flightplan (2005)
 Abandoned (2010)

References

Bibliography 
 
 Noack, Frank. Veit Harlan: The Life and Work of a Nazi Filmmaker. University Press of Kentucky, 2016.
 Schiweck, Ingo & Toonen, Hans. Maharadscha, Tschetnik, Kriegsheimkehrer: der Schauspieler Frits van Dongen oder Philip Dorn. Der Andere Verlag, 2003.

External links 
 

1938 films
Films of Nazi Germany
1930s historical drama films
German historical drama films
1930s German-language films
Films directed by Veit Harlan
Films about missing people
Films set in 1867
Films set in Paris
Films based on urban legends
Films with screenplays by Thea von Harbou
German black-and-white films
Tobis Film films
1938 drama films
1930s German films
Films shot at Bavaria Studios
Films shot at Halensee Studios
Films shot in Paris